Bela Crkva (Бела Црква) is a village in Serbia. It is situated in the Krupanj municipality, in the Mačva District of Central Serbia. The village had a Serb ethnic majority and a population of 755 in 2002.

Historical population

1948: 1,053 (mainly native Serbs)
1953: 1,080
1961: 998
1971: 926
1981: 888
1991: 866
2002: 755

References

See also
List of places in Serbia

Populated places in Mačva District